Koloonella capricornia is a species of sea snail, a marine gastropod mollusk in the family Murchisonellidae, the pyrams and their allies.

Distribution
This marine species occurs off the Northern Territory and Queensland, Australia.

References

External links
 To World Register of Marine Species

Murchisonellidae
Gastropods described in 1906